Joona Harjama (born 5 July 1993) is a Finnish professional ice hockey center who is currently playing with KalPa in the Finnish Liiga.

Harjama made his SM-liiga debut playing with KalPa during the 2012–13 season.

References

External links

1993 births
Living people
Finnish ice hockey centres
KalPa players
SaPKo players
People from Hamina
Sportspeople from Kymenlaakso